Daniella Luxembourg (Israel, 1950) is an Israeli art dealer, based in London.

Biography 
She was born in Israel, daughter of Holocaust survivors, and grew up in a suburb of Haifa. She discovered art through literature and reading. She worked for several museums and art institutions and in 1984 she launched Sotheby's in Israel, first auction house in the country.

Between 1989 and 1991 she was the founding director of the Jewish Museum in Vienna.

In 1997, art collector Simon de Pury left Sotheby's to start an art advisory company and dealership with Daniella Luxembourg, called de Pury and Luxembourg Art. In 2001 the company merged with Philips Auctioneers, which was named Phillips, de Pury & Luxembourg (from 2001 to 2002) and then Phillips de Pury & Company (from 2003 to 2012). Project it was backed by the LVMH Group, and Luxembourg left it in 2004.

In 2006 she commissioned the sale of Gustav Klimt's “Portrait of Adele Bloch-Bauer” (1903–07) to American businessman Ronald Lauder for $135mn. In 2008 she founded the Bauhaus Foundation Tel Aviv, a private museum. She has been a board member of the Courtauld Institute of Art.

In the 2009 she opened the Luxembourg & Dayan art gallery together with Amalia Dayan, and sooner after Daniella's daughter Alma left Christie's and joined the company. In 2020 Dayan left the company, which it was renamed to Luxembourg & Co.

In 2019 she was awarded by the Courtauld Institute of Art, "in recognition of her outstanding contributions to visual arts".

In 2022 she opened a new gallery in New York, at the Fuller Building. First exhibit is a selection of Joan Miró's works from 1924 to 1936

References 

Israeli art dealers
People from Haifa
1950 births
Living people